Morrissey, born Steven Patrick Morrissey, English singer-songwriter and former lead singer of The Smiths 

Morrissey may also refer to:

 Morrissey (surname)

Other uses 
 Morrissey–Mullen, British jazz-rock fusion band
 Effie M. Morrissey, 1890s American schooner
 Morrissey Hearing, legal proceeding, much less formal than a trial, used in the United States to handle parole violations 
 Morrissey Hall (University of Notre Dame)
 Morrissey Provincial Park, British Columbia

See also

Morisset (disambiguation)